Ou Reang Ov District is a district (srok) located in Tboung Khmum Province, Cambodia. The district capital is Ou Reang Ov town located around 30 kilometres south of the provincial capital of Kampong Cham by road. Ou Reang Ov lies on the border where Tboung Khmum, Kampong Cham and Prey Veng provinces meet; the town of Prey Veng is only 42 kilometres away by road.

Prior to 31 December 2013 when Tboung Khmum Province was formed by royal decree, the district was part of Kampong Cham Province. Ou Reang Ov is easily accessed by road from Kampong Cham or Prey Veng town. Ou Reang Ov is a long narrow district located in southern Tboung Khmum. A large rubber plantation covers the northern part of the district. Ou Reang Ov town lies on National Highway 11 which runs from Neak Leung in Prey Veng province to an intersection with National Highway 7 at Thnal Totoung in Tboung Kmom District.

Location 
Ou Reang Ov district lies in the southwestern region of Tboung Khmum Province, sharing a border with Prey Veng Province to the south and Kampong Cham to the west. Reading from the north clockwise, Ou Reang Ov borders with Tboung Khmum District to the north and Ponhea Kraek District to the east, while Kanhchriech and Sithor Kandal districts of Prey Veng Province are to the south. Sithor Kandal district continues from the south to wrap around the lower western border of the district and Koh Sotin district of Kampong Cham makes up the remainder of the western border.

Operation Pacific Angel 
In 2008, Ou Reang Ov district was home to a humanitarian mission from Operation Pacific Angel. Operation Pacific Angel is a recurring joint/combined humanitarian assistance mission sponsored by United States Pacific Command (USPACOM) designed to bring humanitarian civic assistance and civil-military operations to areas in need in the Pacific region. In May 2008, the first Pacific Angel mission took place. Members of the US Air Force, US Army, and US Marine Corps conducted the twofold mission to Cambodia and Thailand. At the Ou Reang Ov district hospital, medical and dental programs were set up to see patients along with doctors from the Royal Cambodian Armed Forces and the Children’s Surgical Centre. Medical staff provided cost-free general medical care, women's health care, and ophthalmology/optometry care to a total of more than 6,000 people in Kampong Chhnang and what was then part of Kampong Cham.

Administration 
The Ou Reang Ov district governor reports to the Governor of Tboung Khmum. The following table shows the villages of Ou Reang Ov district by commune.

Demographics 
The district is subdivided into 7 communes (khum) and 141 villages (phum). According to the 1998 Census, the population of the district was 82,806 persons in 16,940 households in 1998. With a population of over 80,000 people, Ou Reang Ov district has one of the smaller district populations in Tboung Khmum province. The average household size in Ou Reang Ov is 4.9 persons per household, which is slightly lower than the rural average for Cambodia (5.2 persons). The sex ratio in the district is 90.5%, with significantly more females than males.

References 

Districts of Tboung Khmum province